The Sacramento Historic City Cemetery (or Old City Cemetery), located at 1000 Broadway, at 10th Street, is the oldest existing cemetery in Sacramento, California. It was designed to resemble a Victorian garden and sections that are not located in level areas are surrounded by brick or concrete retaining walls to create level terraces. The cemetery grounds are noted for their roses which are said to be among the finest in California.

History
The cemetery was established in 1849 when Sacramento founder John Augustus Sutter, Jr. donated  to the city for this purpose. The grounds were landscaped in the Victorian Garden style popular at the time. The New Helvetia Cemetery was founded in c. 1845 and was also prone to flooding, which would unbury the bodies from the earlier graves; as a result some of the burials from New Helvetia were reinterred to the Sacramento Historic City Cemetery starting as early as 1850.

In 1850, some 600 victims of the Cholera epidemic that swept the city were buried in mass graves in City Cemetery. The remainder 800 victims claimed by the epidemic were buried in the nearby New Helvetia Cemetery, also in mass graves. In 1852, a monument was erected to those who died. However the exact location of the mass burial plot is not known.

In 1856, the city engaged a cemetery superintendent and began to plan the grounds. In 1857, the gatehouse and bell tower were constructed.  These were demolished in 1949 during the widening of Broadway. Several fraternal groups purchased sections for their members including the Masons (1859), Odd Fellows (1861) and the Sacramento Pioneers Association (1862). The city set aside a section for volunteer firemen in 1858 and members of the Grand Army of the Republic in 1878. The cemetery continued to acquire additional land through 1880 when Margaret Crocker, widow of Edwin B. Crocker, donated  to expand the grounds to  total. The City of Sacramento owns the cemetery, which today encompasses .

It was declared a State Historic Landmark on May 5, 1957, by the State Historical Landmarks Commission. The cemetery was listed on the National Register of Historic Places in 2014.

Notable burials
These are some of the notable people interred in the cemetery:
 Hardin Bigelow – first directly elected Mayor of Sacramento
 Marion Biggs – US Representative
 John Bigler – third Governor of California and Minister to Chile
 Newton Booth – United States Senator & Eleventh Governor of California
 John Chilton Burch – US Representative
 Amos P. Catlin – California State Legislator that wrote and carried the bill to make Sacramento the permanent capital of California
 Thomas Jefferson Clunie – US Representative
 George B. Cosby – Confederate State Army Brigader General
 Aimée Crocker – heiress daughter of Edwin B. Crocker
 Edwin B. Crocker – California Supreme Court Justice and founder of the Crocker Art Museum
 Jerome C. Davis – Pioneer rancher/farmer and namesake of Davis, California and UC Davis, which were built on his former land
 John W. Donnellan – 1st Treasurer of the Wyoming Territory
 Charles Duncombe – Member of the Legislative Assembly of Upper Canada , California State Assemblymember in Sacramento County and one of the first doctors in Sacramento
 James L. English – Mayor of Sacramento and California State Treasurer
 Newton T. Gould – Civil War soldier and Medal of Honor recipient
 William S. Hamilton – son of American founding father Alexander Hamilton. He died in Sacramento, most likely of cholera, in 1850.
 Frederick Winslow Hatch – served as Chaplain of the United States Senate
 Mark Hopkins Jr. – one of the Big Four & a founder of the Central Pacific Railroad
 William Irwin – thirteenth Governor of California
 Grove L. Johnson – US Representative and father of US Senator & Governor of California Hiram Johnson
 John F. Madden – US Army brigadier general
 Hugh C. Murray – California Supreme Court Justice
 Henry L. Nichols – Mayor of Sacramento and Secretary of State of California
 Levi Rackliffe – State Treasurer of California
 Benjamin B. Redding – Mayor of Sacramento, California State Assemblymember, Secretary of State of California and the namesake for the city of Redding, California
 Lebbeus Simkins – Civil War sailor and Medal of Honor recipient
 Royal T. Sprague – California State Senator and California Supreme Court Justice
 John Augustus Sutter Jr. – founder and planner of the City of Sacramento, US Consul in Acapulco, Mexico and son of John Augustus Sutter, Sr.
 Jabez Turner – Mayor of Sacramento
 A. A. H. Tuttle – California State Assemblymember, Secretary of State of California  and the namesake of Tuttletown, California
 Edwin G. Waite – California State Assemblymember and Secretary of State of California
 Albert Maver Winn – first City Council of Sacramento and chosen as President (ex officio Mayor), California State Adjutant General and founder of the Native Sons of the Golden West
 Gen. George Wright – General in the Union Army of the American Civil War
 Lt. Thomas F. Wright – son of Gen. George Wright, was killed while fighting in the Modoc War

See also 
 New Helvetia Cemetery (active c. 1845 to 1912), the first cemetery in the city of Sacramento

References

External links

 
 Sacramento Historic City Cemetery Database Project – a search tool to find people buried in the cemetery and other information on the deceased
 The Old City Cemetery Committee of Sacramento – non-profit committee that gives tours and information about the cemetery to raise money for headstone and cemetery restorations. 
 Old website: Old City Cemetery Committee, Inc.
 Cemetery Rose – group that manages and preserves the Historic Rose Garden in the cemetery
 
 

Geography of Sacramento, California
History of Sacramento, California
California Historical Landmarks
1849 establishments in California
Cemeteries on the National Register of Historic Places in California
Tourist attractions in Sacramento, California
National Register of Historic Places in Sacramento, California
Cemeteries in Sacramento County, California